The Batura Glacier gecko (Altiphylax baturensis), also known as the Batura thin-toed gecko, is a species of gecko found in Pakistan and India.

References

 Khan M S; Baig K J 1992 A new Tenuidactylus gecko from northeastern Gilgit Agency, north Pakistan. Pakistan Journal of Zoology 24(4) 1992: 273-277

External links
 

Reptiles of Pakistan
Reptiles described in 1992
Altiphylax